James Alexander E. Elliott (20 October 1869 – 1899) was an English footballer who played in the Football League for Aston Villa.

References

1869 births
1899 deaths
English footballers
Association football defenders
English Football League players
Aston Villa F.C. players
Middlesbrough Ironopolis F.C. players